Govinda Pai Memorial Government College, Manjeswaram is a post-graduate college in Manjeshwar, Kasaragod District, Kerala. The college was established in 1980 and is now affiliated to the Kannur University.
It's also known as GPM Government College, Manjeswaram

Courses Conducted
 The Department of Geography is offering different Complimentary Courses such as Geography of India and Kerala, Map Studies, Disaster Management etc. The Department also offering Courses in GIS and Remote Sensing in outreach mode with the help of ISRO and Indian Institute of Remote Sensing.
 B.A TTM
 B.A Kannada
 B.Com
 B.Sc Statistics
 M. Com. 
 M Sc Statistics

References

External links
 Govinda Pai Memorial Government College, Manjeshwar, Kasargode - Official website

Colleges affiliated to Kannur University
Colleges in Kasaragod district
Educational institutions established in 1980
1980 establishments in Kerala